The Franklin Correctional Institution  is a state prison for men located in Carrabelle, Franklin County, Florida, owned and operated by the Florida Department of Corrections.

Franklin has a mix of security levels, including minimum, medium, and close, and houses adult male offenders.  Franklin first opened in 2005 and has a maximum capacity of 1346 prisoners.

History

A federal civil rights lawsuit filed in 2016 accused prison guards of beating a prisoner and then fatally gassing him with 600 grams of chemical agents.

The facility was the scene of riots in June 2016.  Some three hundred inmates destroyed two housing dorms after drilling through a concrete and brick wall using improvised tools.  The prisoners reportedly surrendered after about two hours, and no injuries were reported.  This was the third such disturbance within six months.

A fourth disturbance occurred in November 2016.

References

Prisons in Florida
Buildings and structures in Franklin County, Florida
2005 establishments in Florida